Key Kam Dar (also known as Kolī Kamdarreh) is a village in Qaedrahmat Rural District, Zagheh District, Khorramabad County, Lorestan Province, Iran. At the 2006 census, its population was 327, in 69 families.

References 

Towns and villages in Khorramabad County